Punicacortein A is an ellagitannin, a polyphenol compound. It is found in the bark of Punica granatum (pomegranate) and in Osbeckia chinensis.

References 

Pomegranate ellagitannins
Heterocyclic compounds with 4 rings
Oxygen heterocycles